Mirela Ana Pașca (born 19 February 1975) is a retired Romanian artistic gymnast, who competed internationally between 1990 and 1992. She is an Olympic silver medalist and a world bronze medalist with the team. Individually, she is a world bronze medalist and a European champion on uneven bars. She was also an uneven bars finalist at the 1992 Olympic Games.

Career
Mirela started to train for gymnastics at the age of 5 at the Baia-Mare Sport Club, under the direction of Adriana and Nelu Pop (who also coached Ludivine Furnon).

In 1990 she joined the national Romanian team. In the same year she tied for gold on the uneven bars with Svetlana Boginskaya and Natalia Kalinina at the European Championships in Athens, Greece.

At the 26th World Gymnastics Championships 1991, Indianapolis, United States she won bronze with the team and placed  8th in the all around event. Mirela also tied for the fourth place on the uneven bars with Henrietta Ónodi in a final in which the bronze medal was not rewarded.  One year later she managed to win a bronze medal for uneven bars at the 1992 World Championschips.

Together with Lavinia Miloșovici, Gina Gogean, Cristina Bontaș, Vanda Hădărean, and Maria Neculiță, Mirela was a member of the Romanian team at the 1992 Summer Olympics Barcelona, Spain. In Barcelona she won silver with the team and tied for the fourth place for the uneven bars with Lavinia Miloșovici and Kim Gwang Suk.

Retirement
Mirela’s last competition was the 1992 DTB cup. After that she graduated in physical education from the Bucharest Ecological University. During her studies she was a member of the aerobic gymnastics team of the university coached by Gineta Stoenescu. In 1996 she won the silver medal for individual women and for mixed pairs (together with her future husband Octavian Romas) at the first Romanian National Aerobic Gymnastics Championships.

In 1997 she left for Spain to become the new gymnastics coach of the Real Grupo de Cultura Covadonga club, based in Gijon.

Mirela returned to Romania to open in  2006 her own fitness and aerobic club.

References

External links

 
 

1975 births
Living people
Romanian female artistic gymnasts
Gymnasts at the 1992 Summer Olympics
Olympic gymnasts of Romania
Olympic silver medalists for Romania
Medalists at the World Artistic Gymnastics Championships
European champions in gymnastics
Olympic medalists in gymnastics
Medalists at the 1992 Summer Olympics
Sportspeople from Baia Mare